Justin Hilton (born December 8, 1988) is an American football wide receiver for the Florida Tarpons of the American Arena League (AAL). Hilton played college football at Indiana State.

Early years
Hilton attended Harmony High School in Harmony, Florida.

College career
Hilton played college football for Indiana State.

Professional career

Cincinnati Bengals
Following the 2012 NFL Draft, Hilton was signed as an undrafted free agent by the Cincinnati Bengals.  Justin was Waived by the Bengals on August 29, 2012.

Hilton was signed to the Bengals practice squad on January 1, 2013. He was moved to the Bengals team roster on January 7, 2013. He was waived on May 2, 2013.

Tampa Bay Storm
On July 3, 2013, Hilton was assigned to the Tampa Bay Storm of the Arena Football League. Hilton was reassigned on July 7th. Hilton was assigned again on July 11, 2013.

Tennessee Titans
Hilton was signed by the Tennessee Titans on July 30, 2013. On August 26, 2013, he was waived by the Titans.

Orlando Predators
Hilton played for the Orlando Predators in 2015.

Spokane Shock
On May 7, 2015, Hilton was traded to the Spokane Shock for future considerations.

Orlando Predators
On May 8, 2015, the Shock traded Hilton back to Orlando.

Tampa Bay Storm
In January 2017, Hilton was assigned to the Tampa Bay Storm. The Storm folded in December 2017.

Florida Tarpons
Hilton signed with the Florida Tarpons of the American Arena League on January 18, 2018

References

External links

Living people
1988 births
People from Osceola County, Florida
Players of American football from Florida
Sportspeople from Greater Orlando
American football wide receivers
Butte Roadrunners football players
Indiana State Sycamores football players
Tampa Bay Storm players
Tennessee Titans players
Orlando Predators players
Spokane Shock players
Florida Tarpons players